Châtelus-le-Marcheix is a commune in the Creuse department in the Nouvelle-Aquitaine region in central France.

Geography
The village lies on the pilgrimage path of the Way of St. James.

Population

Personalities
 Pierre Michon, writer, was born here in 1945.

Sights
 The church, dating from the fourteenth century.
 Ruins of a feudal castle.

See also
Communes of the Creuse department

References

External links

Photographs of the Taurion at Châtelus-le-Marcheix 

Communes of Creuse